Thorpe Marriott is a residential area in Norfolk, England covering part of Taverham and Drayton parishes. Much of the housing was built in the latter part of the 20th century.

It enjoys the amenities of both parishes which are easily accessible from the Fakenham road A1047 road. Although lacking its own school and surgery, The Square in Thorpe Marriott holds five shops, Thorpe Marriott village hall, Trinity Ecumenical Church (Methodist & Anglican) and The Otter public house. In support of the community, Trinity Church hosts the website below.

Further information of how Thorpe Marriott came into being is found in 'History Matters' on that website.

'Churches Together in Drayton, Taverham & Thorpe Marriott' seeks to bind this late 1980s early '90s community together with its greater diversity of population within the two parishes with their ancient roots.

Thorpe Marriott, though being a relatively small area, is home to over 3,600 families. There are three large parks, which at weekends become home to two different children's football teams.

Marriott's Way
Passing through the development is Marriott's Way, a long distance footpath, bridleway and cycle route which forms part of National Cycle Route 1. The route follows two disused railway lines, and runs between the market town of Aylsham and Norwich.

References

Villages in Norfolk
Broadland